Stella Maynes Maxwell (born 15 May 1990) is a fashion model. She is a former Victoria's Secret Angel, and is also the face of the cosmetics brand Max Factor.

Early life
Maxwell was born in Brussels, Belgium, to Northern Irish parents, Stella Maynes and former diplomat Maurice Maxwell. She has three older siblings. Maxwell was raised in Belgium until she was 13 years old, where she attended the European School, Woluwe. She then moved with her family to Canberra, Australia, where they stayed for one year before moving to Wellington, New Zealand when she was 14. She attended Queen Margaret College and the University of Otago, where she was discovered as a model  by an agency based in Dunedin. Maxwell is bilingual in French and English.

Career

She walked the Victoria's Secret Fashion Show 2014 where she was credited. She has been a Victoria's Secret Angel since 2015.

During her career, she has posed for Alexander McQueen, Asos, H&M, Karl Lagerfeld, Roberto Cavalli, Urban Outfitters and Topshop, and has been featured on the covers of the German, Turkish, Spanish, Thai and Japanese editions of the fashion magazine Vogue. As a catwalk model, she has walked for Jeremy Scott, Marc Jacobs, Tommy Hilfiger, Moschino, Brandon Maxwell, Dolce & Gabbana, Jacquemus, Tory Burch, Giles, Dsquared2, Mugler, Fendi, Chanel, Miu Miu and Versace. She notably opened the Concept Korea Spring/Summer 2011 fashion show, during which she was dressed as a Lolita-esque modern day Snow White in hoody, miniskirt and towering shoes. However, she fell on the catwalk and dropped the apple she was carrying. She also fell twice in a row during the finale of the Miu Miu Resort 2016 fashion show.

She collaborated with the French brand The Kooples to create a handbag, named after her.

In 2016, Maxwell was voted No. 1 in 2016 Maxim'''s "Hot 100 List".

She had an uncredited role in the 2018 film JT LeRoy''.

Maxwell appears in the 2021 music video "Chemical" by Beck Hansen.

Personal life
Maxwell is openly queer and identifies as sexually fluid. She briefly dated Miley Cyrus in 2015. From December 2016 to late 2018, she was in a relationship with actress Kristen Stewart; they briefly resumed dating in mid-2019.

References

Sources
Max-Factor : The Max Factor Story
Kristen Stewart Gate-Crashed Our Exclusive Interview With Stella Maxwell
Victoria's Secret : Victoria's Secret

External links

 
 
 
 

1990 births
Alumni of the European Schools
Living people
LGBT models
LGBT people from Northern Ireland
New Zealand female models
New Zealand people of Northern Ireland descent
People educated at Queen Margaret College, Wellington
University of Otago alumni
Victoria's Secret Angels
21st-century New Zealand LGBT people